Robinson's Landing was a location in Baja California, Mexico.  It lay on the west bank of the Colorado River northwest of the north tip of Montague Island in the Colorado River Delta, 10 miles above the mouth of the river on the Gulf of California.  Named for David C. Robinson, it was the place where cargo was unloaded in the river from seagoing craft on to flatbottomed steamboats and carried up to Fort Yuma and points further north on the river from 1852 onward.  Joseph C. Ives, described it as it was in 1858, in his 1861 Report upon the Colorado river of the West The river here was subject to a severe tidal bore that formed in the estuary about Montague Island and propagated upstream and could on occasion swamp barges, boats and ships.  By 1865, a better location was found, ships offloaded their cargos on the east bank of the river at Port Isabel, Sonora, northeast of Montague Island. 17 miles from Robinson's landing and 57 miles below Port Famine.

See also
 Steamboats of the Colorado River

References

External links
 Explorations and Surveys. War Department. Map No. 1. Rio Colorado of the West, explored by 1st Lieut. Joseph C. Ives, Topl. Engrs. under the direction of the Office of Explorations and Surveys. A.A. Humphreys, Capt. Topl. Engrs. in Charge, by order of the Hon. John B. Floyd, Secretary of War. 1858. Drawn by Frhr. F.W.v. Egloffstein. Topographer to the Expedition. Topography by Frhr. F.W.v. Egloffstein. Ruling by Samuel Sartain. Lettering by F. Courtenay. From www.davidrumsey.com, David Rumsey Historical Map Collection website, accessed December 1, 2011.  1st Lieut. Joseph C. Ives Map of the Colorado River showing location of Robinsons Landing and other settlements along the Colorado River in 1858.
  Robinson's Landing, Mouth of Colorado River. Colorado Exploring Expedition. General Report - Plate I. J.J. Young from a photograph by Lieut. Ives. Lith. of Sarony, Major & Knapp, 449 Broadway N.Y. from davidrumsey.com October 27, 2014.

Former populated places in Mexicali Municipality, Baja California
Communities in the Lower Colorado River Valley
Port cities and towns on the Mexican Pacific coast
River ports
Steamboat transport on the Colorado River
Populated places established in 1852
1852 establishments in Mexico